Cameronieta is a genus of mites in the family Spinturnicidae. There are about seven described species in Cameronieta, found in the Neotropics and Caribbean islands.

The species of Cameronieta, like the other members of this family, are parasites of bats. They live primarily on the wing and tail membranes of bats throughout all stages of life.

Species
These seven species belong to the genus Cameronieta:
 Cameronieta almaensis Almeida, Gettinger & Gardner, 2016
 Cameronieta elongata (Furman, 1966)
 Cameronieta machadoi Dusbábek, 1968
 Cameronieta strandtmanni (Tibbetts, 1957)
 Cameronieta thomasi Machado-Allison, 1965
 Cameronieta tibbettsi Dusbábek, 1968
 Cameronieta torrei Dusbábek, 1968

References

Arachnids